Jason Thomas Babin (born May 24, 1980) is a former American football defensive end and outside linebacker who played in the National Football League (NFL). He was drafted by the Houston Texans in the first round of the 2004 NFL Draft. He played college football at Western Michigan, where he was twice recognized as the conference defensive player of the year.

Babin also played for the Seattle Seahawks, Kansas City Chiefs, Tennessee Titans, Philadelphia Eagles, Jacksonville Jaguars, New York Jets, and Baltimore Ravens.

Early years
Babin attended Paw Paw High School and lettered in football, wrestling, and track. In football, he was a two-time team Defensive MVP, and was an All-Kalamazoo Valley Association first-team choice as a senior. In wrestling, he was the state champion as a senior. Babin came back from a broken leg during his senior year, playing in the last three games and earning a scholarship from Western Michigan University. In track & field, Babin was a state-qualifier in the throwing events, with top-throws of 16.15 meters (52 ft 9 in) in the shot put and 47.85 meters (156 ft 4 in) in the discus throw.

College career
Babin attended Western Michigan University, where he played for the Western Michigan Broncos football team from 2000 to 2003. He finished his college football career with 38 sacks, 299 tackles, eight forced fumbles, and two fumble recoveries. Babin started 25 of 47 games at Western Michigan, setting Broncos career marks in sacks (38) and tackles for loss (75).  Babin also had two passes defended, blocked three punts and had three receptions for 55 yards.

Babin started all 12 games at the left defensive end position as a senior, earning first-team All-America honors from The NFL Draft Report and College Sports Report and added second-team honors from Sports Illustrated, The Sporting News, and College Football News. He was a first-team All-Mid-American Conference selection and league's Defensive Player of the Year for the second consecutive season, in addition to being team captain and team MVP. As a senior, he made 115 tackles and matched his career-high with 15 sacks and made 33 tackles behind the line of scrimmage. As a junior, he started all 12 games and made 94 tackles (26 for loss), 15 sacks, two forced fumbles, one fumble recovery, and two passes defensed.  Babin also blocked two punts and caught three passes for 35 yards.  He made 56 tackles (13 for loss) as a sophomore, plus a team-leading seven sacks and two forced fumbles. As a freshman, Babin played in all 12 games, collected 34 tackles and was the only true freshman on the team to earn a letter.

Professional career

Pre-draft

Houston Texans
Babin was drafted by Houston Texans in the first round (27th pick overall) of 2004 NFL Draft. The Texans traded second, third, fourth, and fifth round picks to the Tennessee Titans in exchange for a first (27th overall) and fifth round pick. He was signed to a five-year contract worth $6 million by the Texans on June 26, 2004. He played 16 games in his rookie season for Houston, making 51 solo tackles, 12 assisted tackles, and four sacks.  In 2005, he played in 12 games and made 35 tackles. He matched his 2004 sack mark with four and also forced two fumbles. In 2006, he played 15 games and recorded 26 tackles and five sacks.

Seattle Seahawks
On September 1, 2007, Babin was acquired by the Seattle Seahawks from the Houston Texans in exchange for safety Michael Boulware. He was released by the Seahawks on September 17, 2008 after the team acquired wide receiver Keary Colbert from the Denver Broncos.

Kansas City Chiefs
Babin was signed by the Kansas City Chiefs on November 12, 2008. After the 2008 season, Babin became a free agent.

Philadelphia Eagles
Babin was signed by the Philadelphia Eagles on August 4, 2009.

Tennessee Titans
On March 19, 2010, Babin signed with the Tennessee Titans.  Babin's lone season with Titans proved to be one of his best, recording 58 tackles, 12.5 sacks, and two forced fumbles, which led to him being named to the 2011 Pro Bowl, the first appearance of his career.

Second stint with the Eagles
Following his Pro Bowl season, Babin signed a five-year deal with the Eagles worth approximately $28 million. This deal included guarantees in the $5–6 million range and reunited him with former Titans defensive line coach Jim Washburn. In Week 1 of the 2011 regular season against the St. Louis Rams, Babin had two sacks, which matched his previous total during his last stint with the Eagles. He then would record eight sacks in three games, and climbed to the top of the NFL with 18 sacks with two games remaining in the season. He finished the season with 40 tackles and 18 sacks, the highest of his career.

On November 27, 2012, Babin was released. He had 5.5 sacks through 11 games.

Jacksonville Jaguars
On November 28, 2012, Babin was claimed off waivers by the Jacksonville Jaguars. In five games with the Jaguars, Babin made 11 tackles, 1.5 sacks, 2 forced fumbles, and 1 fumble recovery. Overall in the 2012 season, combined with both teams, Babin played 16 total games with 37 total combined tackles, 7 sacks, 1 pass defended, 4 forced fumbles, and 1 fumble recovery.

On November 17, 2013, Babin inadvertently ripped out a handful of Arizona Cardinals running back Andre Ellington's dreadlocks while defending a running play versus the Arizona Cardinals in Jacksonville. Babin finished the 2013 season with 7.5 sacks on 40 combined tackles, two passes defended, and three forced fumbles.

On March 10, 2014, Babin voided the final two years of his contract to become a free agent. Three days later, on March 13, he re-signed with the team.

Babin was released from the Jaguars on June 19, 2014.

New York Jets
Babin signed a two-year contract with the New York Jets on July 23, 2014. He was released by the Jets on September 5, 2015.

Baltimore Ravens
The Baltimore Ravens signed Babin on September 15, 2015. Babin was released on October 13, 2015.

Arizona Cardinals 
On January 12, 2016, Babin signed with the Arizona Cardinals to add depth as an outside linebacker for the postseason after Alex Okafor was lost to an injury.

NFL statistics

Key
 GP: games played
 COMB: combined tackles
 TOTAL: total tackles
 AST: assisted tackles
 SACK: sacks
 FF: forced fumbles
 FR: fumble recoveries
 FR YDS: fumble return yards 
 INT: interceptions
 IR YDS: interception return yards
 AVG IR: average interception return
 LNG: longest interception return
 TD: interceptions returned for touchdown
 PD: passes defensed

Personal life
Babin has a wife and three sons. He is a supporter of the Republican Party, is an avid poker player, and is well known for his devout love of the theater, which has included multiple trips to plays both on and off Broadway. His father moved from Quebec in Canada to live in Michigan

In 2014, Babin was inducted into the Western Michigan University Athletics Hall of Fame.

Babin cofounded RedZone Realty Group with former Jacksonville Jaguars teammate, Kyle Bosworth.

References

External links

Philadelphia Eagles bio
Tennessee Titans bio
Jacksonville Jaguars bio
New York Jets bio

1980 births
Living people
Players of American football from Michigan
Sportspeople from Kalamazoo, Michigan
American football defensive ends
American football linebackers
Western Michigan Broncos football players
American Conference Pro Bowl players
Houston Texans players
Seattle Seahawks players
Kansas City Chiefs players
Philadelphia Eagles players
Tennessee Titans players
Jacksonville Jaguars players
New York Jets players
Baltimore Ravens players
Arizona Cardinals players
Michigan Republicans
American people of Canadian descent
National Conference Pro Bowl players